Chapter Spitalfields, originally known as Nido Spitalfields, is a student accommodation building located at 9 Frying Pan Alley in Spitalfields, Central London. It is the third tallest student dormitory in the world, behind the Sky Plaza in Leeds, and 17 New Wakefield Street in Manchester.  The 34-storey tower falls within the London Borough of Tower Hamlets, though Middlesex Street forms the boundary with the City of London, the principal financial district of the world. Middlesex Street forms part of the Petticoat Lane Market area.

Prior to construction of Nido, the plot at 100 Middlesex Street was occupied by a 1960-built office building, Rodwell House, which comprised an 8-storey block oriented north-south, surrounded by a single-storey office podium.

In 2015, Nido Spitalfields was purchased by Greystar Real Estate Partners, parent company of the student accommodation company, Chapter. Other Chapter buildings in London are located in the King's Cross area and Portobello.

The tower appears in the Doctor Who episode "The Wedding of River Song".

Gallery

References

See also

 

Residential buildings completed in 2010
Residential skyscrapers in London
Skyscrapers in the London Borough of Tower Hamlets
Spitalfields